Progona VBK is a volleyball club in Gothenburg, Sweden. The club won the Swedish men's national championship in 1983.

References

Sports clubs in Gothenburg
Swedish volleyball clubs